Solomon Mensah Nyarko (born 18 February 1989) is a Ghanaian male badminton player. He competed at the 2010 Commonwealth Games in New Delhi, India. In 2011, he won the bronze medal at the All-Africa Games.

Achievements

All-Africa Games 
Men's doubles

References

External links
 

1989 births
Living people
Ghanaian male badminton players
Badminton players at the 2010 Commonwealth Games
Commonwealth Games competitors for Ghana
Competitors at the 2007 All-Africa Games
Competitors at the 2011 All-Africa Games
African Games bronze medalists for Ghana
African Games medalists in badminton